Oulad Zayda is a river in Morocco and is nearby to Koudyet Twila, Mers Caïd Na’mi and Dar Caïd S’id. The river is located at 31° 51' 36" N,7° 27' 00" W.

References

Rivers of Morocco
Zayda